Kantharellidae is a family of worms belonging to the class Rhombozoa, order unassigned. The family consists of only one genus: Kantharella Czaker, 1994.

References

Dicyemida